Sarah-Anne Brault (born 1 December 1989) is a Canadian triathlete. She finished in second place at the 2012 ITU Triathlon World Cup in Edmonton. In 2016, she was named in the Canadian Olympic team.

References

External links
 
 
 

1989 births
Living people
Canadian female triathletes
Triathletes at the 2016 Summer Olympics
Olympic triathletes of Canada
People from Lévis, Quebec
Sportspeople from Quebec
21st-century Canadian women